Vittetia is a genus of Brazilian plants in the tribe Eupatorieae within the family Asteraceae.

 Species
 Vittetia bishopii R.M.King & H.Rob. - Minas Gerais
 Vittetia orbiculata (DC.) R.M.King & H.Rob. - Paraná, Santa Catarina, São Paulo

References

Asteraceae genera
Endemic flora of Brazil
Eupatorieae